Sari-ye Sofla (also Romanized as Sārī-ye Soflá and Sārī Soflá) is a village in Kuhpayeh Rural District, Nowbaran District, Saveh County, Markazi Province, Iran. At the 2006 census, its population was 55, in 19 families.

References 

Populated places in Saveh County